Willie Lake is a lake in Meeker County, in the U.S. state of Minnesota.

Willie Lake was named for U. S. Willie (or Wiley), a state legislator.

See also
List of lakes in Minnesota

References

Lakes of Minnesota
Lakes of Meeker County, Minnesota